In the 1950s, together with a variety of designs of dinghies, Fairey Marine Ltd produced larger sailing cruisers, the Atalanta (named after Sir Richard's wife), Titania, and Fulmar, also the 27' Fisherman motor sailer (based on the Fairey Lifeboat hull). They also made the 15' Cinderella (outboard runabout)/ Carefree (inboard runabout), and the 16'6" Faun (outboard powered family cruiser).

Between 1956 and 1968 Fairey Marine produced some 291 Atalanta class sailing yachts, designed by Uffa Fox: The Atalanta was conceived in 1955 by Alan Vines, a senior executive at Fairey, with the expertise of Uffa Fox who was their Design Consultant. It was envisaged as a trailable shallow draft performance cruiser with the sea keeping capabilities and safety of a fin keel yacht. Over the succeeding decades the distinctive centre cockpit design with its rolled decks and generous accommodation has more than fulfilled expectations, offering a respectable turn of speed in light airs while her retractable cast iron keels give outstanding heavy weather performance in a seaway. Robust enough to carry its full sail in winds up to force five, the Atalanta retains many of the handling characteristics of a classic dinghy.

Fairey Marine went on to produce three variants of the Atalanta, another 26 ft (8.1m) hull with a slightly shorter cockpit and more headroom called the Titania (named after another Fairey flying boat), a larger version -the Atalanta 31 (9.45m)- and the Fulmar a 20 ft(6.1m) version with a single lifting keel. Small Dinghies were built using similar techniques as tenders for the larger boats.

Production Yachts from Fairey Marine

 Atalanta 26
 Atalanta 31
 Titania (also 26 ft but with greater cabin headroom)
 Fulmar

Dimensions for Atalanta 31

LOA: 31´ (9.45m)

Max beam: 8´3" (2.51m)

Freeboard fwd: 4' (1.22m)

Freeboard aft: 2'3" (0.7m)

Draft keels up: 2' (0.61m)

Draft keels down: 7' (2.13m)

Total weight of keels: 2,120lbs (962 kg) for the two

Designed load displacement: 8,000lbs (3,628 kg)

Sails: 
Main: 192ft2, 
Genoa: 275ft2

Height of sail plan over sheerline: 37' (11.28m)

Sailing yachts
1950s sailboat type designs